Wombats RC is an Austrian rugby club in Wiener Neustadt.

History
The club was founded in 2003 in the nearby town of Bad Fischau-Brunn by current president, Australian Colin McLachlan. A group of players gathered in the Flying Kangaroo pub and set about forming a club.

From 2007 up to 2010, they teamed up with RC Krems and played as the Niederösterreich XV.

Players

Current squad

External links

Austrian rugby union teams